The Tubden Shedubling is a Buddhist temple complex in Otradnoye District, Moscow, and the first in the Russian capital.

Content of the project
Buddhism has for several centuries been a major religion in several regions of Russia, including the republics of Tuva, Buryatia, and Kalmykia, and an important part of these cultures and identity.

The temple complex is intended as a religious object, a center of social, cultural, research and publishing life (named “The Cultural-and-Educational Center”), and to enhance cooperation between the representatives of different nationalities and confessions.  The Cultural-and-Educational Center will comprise a conference-hall, a library, as well as a charitable cafeteria, a medical center and a smaller temple for enshrinement of holy relics.

General specifications

When completed the total area built on is intended to be 1186.5 m2, on a plot of land with an area of 2875.5 m2. The complex will include:

Development
The Moscow Buddhist Society has performed a wide scope of works for implementation and coordination of the whole Project having filed all applications for obtaining the Building Construction Permission for the Buddhist Temple with a Stupa in Moscow to be built at: Moscow, Novovladykinsky Proezd, ow. 15.

The order of the Mayor of Moscow dated 26.10.2000 № 1117-РМ «On construction of the Buddhist Temple on the site located at Novovladykinsky Proezd, 15 in the North-Eastern Administrative District of Moscow» has become a basic document for drafting permission documentation. Contract of Lease № М-02-510122, dated 6.09.2004, was signed on the basis of this Order.

In 2005, the Moscow Buddhist Society managed to increase the territory of the construction almost twice, therefore, Order of the Government of Moscow dated 28.12.2005 № 1109-PP «On amendments and additions to the Order of the Mayor of Moscow dated 26 October, 2000 № 1117-РМ» was issued with the following amendments in clause 1.1: «To permit the Moscow Buddhist Society to construct the Buddhist Temple at the address: Novovladykinsky Proezd, ow.15, of the total maximum area of 3,000 sq.m (including the construction site of 2,100 sq.m.) on the surface area of 0.6027 ha».

Along with the above-mentioned papers, the pre-Project and Project documentation has been developed. The scope of the Project documentation has been elaborated by the LLC “Personal Creative Workshop of Architect Tereshkin P.G.” under the guidance of Architect Tereshkin P.G.

On 1 October 2014, the Moscow Buddhist Society obtained Building Construction Permission № RU77175000-010023.

The Moscow Buddhist Society negotiated with potential sponsors. The contractor was determined and the “Preliminary” stage of construction works was finished.

On 19 February 2015 the completed  was consecrated by two lamas from the central khurul of Kalmykia, in a ceremony attended by the ambassadors of Mongolia, Vietnam, Myanmar, and Sri Lanka, and representatives of the Russian republics, where Buddhism is traditionally practiced; Tuva, Kalmykia and Buryatia. On 15 May 2015 People's Artist Joseph Kobzon attended a ceremony for the start of construction on the complex's temple.

References

Buddhist monasteries in Russia
Tibetan Buddhism in Europe
Religious buildings and structures in Moscow